Rose-Belle is a small town of southeastern Mauritius.

Location 
It is located in Grand Port district, ten kilometers west of the district's well known town, Mahébourg. The population of the town in 2021 is 12,799. Of the 20 cities in Mauritius, Rose Belle ranks 15 in the Mauritius population.

References

Grand Port District
Populated places in Mauritius